The 2005–06 World Series of Poker Circuit is the 2nd annual World Series of Poker Circuit.

Event schedule

Notes 

World Series of Poker Circuit
2006 in poker